Simplicivalva philobia is a moth in the family Cossidae first described by Herbert Druce in 1898. It is found in Panama.

References

Cossulinae
Moths described in 1898
Taxa named by Herbert Druce